Mohammad Abdur Razzaque (born 1 February 1950) is a Bangladeshi politician and the incumbent Minister of Agriculture. He is also the incumbent Jatiya Sangsad member representing Tangail-1 constituency since 2001. He served as Minister of Food and Disaster Management from 2009 to 2012 and then, as Minister of Food until 2013. He has been the Chairman of the Parliamentary Standing Committee for Finance since 2014. He has also been serving as a presidium member of Bangladesh Awami League since 2016.

Razzaque was also the head of the Election Manifesto sub-committee of Bangladesh Awami League for the 11th Bangladeshi general election in 2018.

Early life and career
Razzaque was born on 1 February 1950 in Musuddi village of Tangail subdivision, East Pakistan (now Dhanbari Upazila, Tangail District, Bangladesh) to Jalal Uddin and Rezia Khatun. He has distinctively completed graduation with honors from Bangladesh Agricultural University (BAU) in 1971 and also completed post graduation in 1972 from the same campus. From Purdue University, USA, he achieved his PhD in 1983. He is one among the very few experts on this land on Farming System Research and Sustainable Rural Agricultural Development. He has further studied in East Angelia University-UK & participated in several training programs at home and abroad.

Razzaque started his career by joining Bangladesh Agricultural Development Corporation (BADC) as a scientific officer and ended as the chief scientific officer in 2001.

Contribution in Liberation War 1971
In the 6 point, 11 point and anti-Ayub movement, Razzak took an essential part. He was a company commander in the 1971 Bangladesh Liberation War. He is one of the freedom fighters in Tangail Zila.

Political career
Razzaque started his political career in student life. He was elected the Vice President of the student union of Bangladesh Agricultural University. He was also the President of Bangladesh Student League, BAU unit.

Razzaque was first elected as the Member of Parliament for Tangail-1 in 2001. He has also served as the Agricultural Secretary of Bangladesh Awami League for many years before being elected as a Presidium Member in the National Council of the party held in October, 2016. He was appointed Minister of Food and Disaster Management in 2009. After the ministry was split in two in 2012, he continued as Minister of Food until 2013.

Served
 Bangladesh Agricultural Research Council (former director)
 Bangladesh Agronomist Institution (secretary general) of in 1996–97

References

1950 births
Living people
Mukti Bahini personnel
Purdue University College of Agriculture alumni
Awami League politicians
8th Jatiya Sangsad members
9th Jatiya Sangsad members
10th Jatiya Sangsad members
11th Jatiya Sangsad members
Disaster Management and Relief ministers of Bangladesh
Food ministers of Bangladesh
Agriculture ministers of Bangladesh
Bangladeshi agriculturalists